Thomas Arthur (died 19 July 1486) was a Roman Catholic prelate who served as Bishop of Limerick (1469–1486).

Biography
On 14 July 1469, Thomas Arthur was appointed during the papacy of Pope Paul II as Bishop of Limerick.
On 10 September 1469, he was consecrated bishop by Šimun Vosić, Archbishop of Bar, with Cornelius O'Cunlis, Bishop Emeritus of Clonfert, and Nicholas O'Flanagan, Bishop of Elphin, serving as co-consecrators at Santa Maria sopra Minerva in Rome . 
He served as Bishop of Limerick until his death on 19 July 1486.

Arthur was a native of Limerick city and member of a prominent family. His father was Nicholas Arthur and mother is named as Catherine Skyddy. Of his five brothers four served as mayor (provost) of Limerick and the other served as sheriff. Canon Begley notes that Arthur was provided the revenues due to the bishop of the diocese for eight years before he became bishop but he never paid the Annates. Once he was consecrated he paid the money to Rome.

See also
Catholic Church in Ireland

References

15th-century Roman Catholic bishops in Ireland
Bishops appointed by Pope Paul II
1486 deaths
Roman Catholic bishops of Limerick